Imagination is the eleventh studio album recorded by American R&B group Gladys Knight & the Pips, released in October 1973 on the Buddah label. The album, the group's first for Buddah after leaving Motown, includes their first and only Billboard Hot 100 number-one hit "Midnight Train to Georgia", which also reached number-one on the R&B singles chart. Larry Wilcox was credited for the string and horn arrangements.

The album also produced other successful singles, including "I've Got to Use My Imagination" and "Best Thing That Ever Happened to Me", with both songs peaking at number-one on the R&B singles chart and top five on the Billboard Hot 100, and the moderately successful single "Where Peaceful Waters Flow".  The album was also their second studio album to make the top ten on the Billboard 200 and their second of five R&B albums chart-toppers.

Critical reception
Rolling Stone wrote that "Imagination is exactly what this album so desperately lacks," and noted the pattern of "nice touches, brilliant moments overcome by the anonymous production and banal lyrics."

Track listing

Personnel
Gladys Knight - lead vocals
Merald "Bubba" Knight - background vocals
William Guest - background vocals
Edward Patten - background vocals

Charts

Singles

Certifications

See also
List of number-one R&B albums of 1973 (U.S.)
List of number-one R&B albums of 1974 (U.S.)

References

External links
Imagination at Discogs

Gladys Knight & the Pips albums
1973 albums
Buddah Records albums
Albums with cover art by Joel Brodsky